Microsynodontis lamberti is a species of upside-down catfish endemic to the Democratic Republic of the Congo where it is found in the Lilanda River.  This species grows to a length of  SL.

References
 
 

Mochokidae
Freshwater fish of Africa
Fish of the Democratic Republic of the Congo
Endemic fauna of the Democratic Republic of the Congo
Fish described in 1963